Lothar Albrich (20 August 1905 – 3 November 1978) was a Romanian hurdler. He competed in the men's 110 metres hurdles at the 1928 Summer Olympics.

References

External links
 

1905 births
1978 deaths
Athletes (track and field) at the 1928 Summer Olympics
Romanian male hurdlers
Olympic athletes of Romania